Tani may refer to:

Tani (letter), a letter in the Georgian scripts
Tani people, a group of tribes in Arunachal Pradesh, India
Tani languages, a group of languages spoken in Arunachal Pradesh, India
 Maiani language, also known as Tani, a language of Papua New Guinea
Tani (surname), a Japanese surname
Tani District, a district in Khost Province, Afghanistan
Tani, Khost, capital of the district
Tani, Prasat a sub-district of Prasat District in Surin Province, Thailand

People with the given name
 Tani Adewumi (born 2010), Nigerian-American chess player
Tani Cohen-Mintz, Israeli basketball player

See also
 Nang Tani, a ghost in Thai folklore
 
 Tanni Grey-Thompson (born 1969), British athlete

Language and nationality disambiguation pages